Pritobolny District is an administrative and municipal district (raion), one of the twenty-four in Kurgan Oblast, Russia. It is located in the south of the oblast. Its administrative center is the rural locality (a selo) of Glyadyanskoye. Population:  17,596 (2002 Census);  The population of Glyadyanskoye accounts for 27.2% of the district's total population.

References

Notes

Sources

Districts of Kurgan Oblast